The fifth season of Battle of the Blades premiered on September 19, 2019, on CBC Television after a six-year hiatus from the sport, featuring seven couples.

Ron MacLean returns as host alongside head judge Kurt Browning, with Colby Armstrong joining the judging panel permanently after suffering an injury that ruled him out of the competition. The season featured a rotation of guest judges, with Tessa Virtue & Scott Moir serving as guest judges during Week 1. The season rotated between three venues, with the first three weeks taking place at the FirstOntario Centre in Hamilton, Ontario, Week 4 taking place at the Paramount Fine Foods Centre in Mississauga, Ontario and the last three weeks in Oshawa, with two weeks at the Tributes Community Centre and the finale taking place at the Ryerson's Mattamy Athletic Centre.

For the first time in the show's history, viewers from outside Canada are allowed to view the dances and vote for their favourite couples. The scoring also changed from a 6.0 to a 10.0 system for Week 1, referring back to the 6.0 system from Week 2 onwards.

Couples

Scoring Chart
Red numbers indicate the couples with the lowest score for each week.
Green numbers indicate the couples with the highest score for each week.
 indicates the couple(s) eliminated that week.
 indicates the returning couple that finished in the bottom two the previous week, but won the Skate-Off.
 indicates the Skate-Off finished in a draw.
 indicates the winning couple.
 indicates the runner-up couple.
 indicates the third-place couple.

Judges 
Each week, Colby Armstrong and Kurt Browning act as judges, with guest judges joining them. With the exception of Week 1, each guest judge gave separate scores to the contestants. Colby Armstrong was also considered a guest judge in Week 1, before joining the panel full-time during Week 2.

Individual songs & scores

Week 1
Judges scores in order: Colby Armstrong, Tessa Virtue & Scott Moir, Kurt Browning.

Week 2 
Judges scores in order: Colby Armstrong, Darcy Tucker, Barbara Underhill, Kurt Browning.

Week 3 - Country Week 
Judges scores in order: Colby Armstrong, Marie-France Dubreuil, Kurt Browning.

Week 4 - Stage and Screen Week 
Judges scores in order: Colby Armstrong, Sarah Nurse, Kurt Browning.

Week 5 - R&B Week 
Judges scores in order: Colby Armstrong, Meagan Duhamel, Kurt Browning.

Week 6

Round 1 - Couple's Theme Choice 
Judges scores in order: Colby Armstrong, Tessa Virtue & Scott Moir, Kurt Browning.

In contrast to previous weeks, the skate-off was conducted first.

Round 2 - Favourite Performance of the Season 
Couples performed their favourite routines for the season, although they were not scored by the judges.

Notes
a ^ Violetta & P.J. were given a bye in Week 1 after it was learned that Colby Armstrong would be forced to withdraw from the competition.
b ^ Kaitlyn & Sheldon and Ekaterina & Bruno's skates in Week 6 were not scored by the judges.
c ^ Skates in Week 7 were not scored by the judges.

References

Season 05
Battle of the Blades participants